Pinglin District (a.k.a. Ping-Lin) is a rural district of southeastern New Taipei, Taiwan. It is the third-largest district of New Taipei City and it is located in the mountainous area bordering Yilan County.

Overview
Pinglin is part of the water district of the greater Taipei area as the Feicui Dam is located in the neighboring Shiding District, so land development is restricted. Pinglin is most known for producing pouchong tea. The Pinglin Tea Museum is the world's largest tea museum. Over 80% of its residents are tea growers or are involved in the tea business.

Geography 
Area: 170.84 km³
Population: 6,547 people (February 2023)

Tourist attractions
 Beishi River Historical Trail
 Ping-Lin Tea Museum
 Jingualiao River Fish-Watching Trails
 Jingualiao Tiema Recreation Park
 Jiuchionggen Mountain Trails

Transportation

Roads
 National Highway No. 5, also known as Beiyi or the Chiang Wei-shui Freeway.
 Highway No. 9, also known as Beiyi Highway.

Bus
Bus 923- from Xindian metro station (weekdays: leaves hourly at half-past the hour, weekends: on the hour and half-past)
Bus Green 12 (綠12)- from Xindian metro station (weekdays: leaves at :15 and :45)

See also
 New Taipei City

References

External links

  
Travel guide website

Districts of New Taipei